Martin Straka (born September 3, 1972) is a Czech former ice hockey center who most recently played for HC Plzeň 1929 of the Czech Extraliga. He is also the club's general manager and co-owner, having bought a 70% share of the team in 2009. Straka played in the National Hockey League (NHL) from 1992 until 2008 with the Pittsburgh Penguins, Ottawa Senators, New York Islanders, Florida Panthers, Los Angeles Kings and New York Rangers.

Playing career
Straka was drafted 19th overall by the Penguins in the 1992 NHL Entry Draft, and has played for several teams throughout his 15-year NHL career. After a productive first full season with the Penguins, the shortened 1994-95 season saw him produce only 4 goals and 16 points in 31 games, following which Straka was traded to the Ottawa Senators on April 7, 1995 for Norm MacIver and Troy Murray. The following season, on January 23, 1996, less than a year after being traded to Ottawa, he was traded again. Straka was traded to the New York Islanders in a three-way, five-player deal between Ottawa, New York and the Toronto Maple Leafs, that involved Straka, Kirk Muller, Ken Belanger, Don Beaupre, Bryan Berard, Damian Rhodes and Wade Redden. He would be placed on waivers and claimed by the Florida Panthers on March 15, 1996. Florida would not re-sign Straka after the 1996–97 season, which made him an unrestricted free agent.  He then returned to Pittsburgh beginning in 1997–98.

In 1998-99 he set new career highs, logging 35 goals and 48 assists, but his second season was less successful, but he had established himself as one of the leagues premiere two-way players due to his explosive speed and on-ice vision. With the return of Mario Lemieux he would go on to have a career year during the 2000–2001 season for Pittsburgh as he amassed 27 goals and 95 points and in 82 games.

In the following season of 2001-02 his speedy reputation would be called into jeopardy after a season-ending injury in the form of a broken leg, an injury which would take him years to fully recover from. On November 30, 2003, in a cost-cutting move, the Penguins would deal Straka to the Los Angeles Kings for Russian prospect Sergei Anshakov and defenceman Martin Strbak. Straka would later sign as a free agent by the Rangers on August 2, 2005 and went on to have two productive 70 point seasons. On January 17, 2007, despite reports that he was considering retirement, Straka signed a one-year contract extension for the 2007–08 season.

On February 16, 2008 in a game against the Buffalo Sabres, Straka assisted on a goal to record his 700th NHL point.

He was a part of the gold medal-winning Olympic team at the 1998 Winter Olympics in Nagano. He also won gold in the 2005 Men's World Ice Hockey Championships in Vienna.

In July 2008, Straka returned home to the Czech Extraliga, signing a one-year deal with HC Lasselsberger Plzeň (now HC Plzeň 1929).

In the 2012–13 season, he won with HC Škoda Plzeň Czech Extraliga title. He scored a winning goal in 7th final play-off game versus PSG Zlín in second overtime.

On March 28, 2014, Straka announced his retirement from professional hockey.

Career statistics

Regular season and playoffs

International

References

External links
 

1972 births
Living people
Cleveland Lumberjacks players
Czech ice hockey centres
Florida Panthers players
HC Plzeň players
Ice hockey players at the 1998 Winter Olympics
Ice hockey players at the 2006 Winter Olympics
Los Angeles Kings players
National Hockey League All-Stars
National Hockey League first-round draft picks
New York Islanders players
New York Rangers players
Olympic bronze medalists for the Czech Republic
Olympic gold medalists for the Czech Republic
Olympic ice hockey players of the Czech Republic
Ottawa Senators players
Sportspeople from Plzeň
Pittsburgh Penguins draft picks
Pittsburgh Penguins players
Olympic medalists in ice hockey
Medalists at the 2006 Winter Olympics
Medalists at the 1998 Winter Olympics
Czech expatriate ice hockey players in the United States
Czech expatriate ice hockey players in Canada